Joseph Pavliv (May 29, 1940 - November 10, 2008) was a Ukrainian novelist and short-story writer.

Early life and education
Joseph (Yosyp) Pavliv was born on May 29, 1940 in the Dobrotvir village (now Kamyanka-Buzka region, near Lviv) to Petro Pavliv and Ustina Pavliv (née Gural). He was the youngest of seven children.
In 1962, Pavliv graduated from the Lviv Polytechnic National University.

Career 
Following his graduation, Pavliv joined a scientific research expedition to Yakutia, where he worked until the late 1960s, becoming a pioneer of Yakutia’s literature of the 20th century.

One of his best known short novels, Field Season, was written in Oymyakon, the coldest inhabitant area on Earth, where winter temperatures average -58F (“Полевой Сезон” in Russian, “Борис Черняк та інші” in Ukrainian).
In 1977, he graduated from the Maxim Gorky Literature Institute in Moscow, the only University for creative writing in the history of the Soviet Union. 
From the 1960’s to 1980’s, Pavliv was published by the major literary magazines of the country, including the «Polyatnaua Zvezda» (Polar Star) and the «Dal'nij Vostok» (Far East). During the 1970’s and early 1980’s he wrote for the Komsomolska Pravda newspaper. Pavliv’s work was published in Ukrainian literary magazines Dnipro and Ukraina. 
He lived in Russia for over 20 years, particularly in Yakutia and the Far East in the Khabarovsk region, which is where he wrote one of his most notable works, Tracking the Sable Cubs. In the short novel, Pavliv writes about how unpredictable, fragile and unintelligible the human soul is, describing the beauty of nature in the North, nuances and dilemmas of human impact on it. 
Pavliv is the only author who ever worked on the construction of Baikal-Amur Mainline (BAM) in Russia as both a writer and an engineer. He joined Ukraine’s first BAM team sent to build the railway section in the Khabarovsk region in 1974 and lived there for more than a decade. His novel, The Adventures of Kuzia and His Human, takes place there. Kuzia was a Shiba Inu, a rare breed in Russia at the time. 
Since returning to Ukraine in 1985, at the time of Soviet leader Mikhail Gorbachev’s liberal policies of “perestroika” and “glasnost”, Pavliv invested himself in the rebirth of Ukrainian language, literature and folklore. A stoic reporter and wonderful storyteller, he covered communities throughout Chernihiv region for its biggest newspaper at the time, Desnianska Pravda, for almost a decade before moving to Kyiv in the mid-1990s. 
After the fall of the Soviet Union in 1991, he chose to stay in Ukraine, giving up the option of Russian citizenship and becoming a member of Ukraine’s Union of Creative Writers as well as the National Union of Journalists. 
In 2004 he moved to New York, but returned to Ukraine shortly after.

Joseph Pavliv died suddenly on November 10, 2008 near the Schaslyve village, outside of Kyiv. He is buried at the Baikove Cemetery in Kyiv, Ukraine. 
His works are being translated to English by Andrew Bromfield.
Joseph Pavliv is the father of journalist Halia Pavliva.

Awards and honors
In February 2009, The Adventures of Kuzia and His Human won the Publishers’ Choice Award of the main literary contest in Ukraine, Coronation of the Word.

Selected works

 «Слідами соболят» (Tracking the Sable Cubs), Kyiv, publisher “Soviet Writer”, 1989.
 «Сніги цвітуть» (Flourishing Snow, collection of short stories), Molod (Youth) publishing house, Kyiv, 1985.
 повесть «Борис Черняк та інші (Boris Chernyak and others, short novel)  Ukraine, Dnipro magazine № 1, 1984.
 рассказ «Хитрый бондарь» (Clever Cooper, short story), Far East magazine, Khabarovsk, Russia, №1, 1988.
 «Полярная Звезда», № 5 (сентябрь-октябрь) 1972 г., повесть «Блики Севера» (Glare of the North short novel), Polar Star Yakutia literary magazine, 1972, №5.
 Ukraine magazine, March 1986 № 12, 
 Coronation of the Word Ukraine’s national literary contest, 2009

Sources
 Павлів Йосип Петрович

External links
 Союз писателей Украины
 :uk:Коронація слова
 Выпускники Литературного института имени А. М. Горького −1977
 Капитаны «Дальнего Востока»
 Михаил Вишняков
 Поэтическая Россия

1940 births
2008 deaths
Ukrainian writers